James Crawford "Jake" Williams (August 28, 1905 – March 20, 1967) was an American football player. He played college football at TCU and professional football in the National Football League (NFL) as a tackle, end, guard, and center for the Chicago Cardinals. He appeared in 44 NFL games, 28 as a starter, from 1929 to 1933.

References

1905 births
1967 deaths
TCU Horned Frogs football players
Chicago Cardinals players
Players of American football from Texas